The Botany of Lord Auckland's Group and Campbell's Island  is a description of the plants discovered in those islands during the Ross expedition written by Joseph Dalton Hooker and published by Reeve Brothers in London between 1844 and 1845. Hooker sailed on HMS Erebus as assistant surgeon. It was the first in a series of four Floras in the Flora Antarctica, the others being the Botany of Fuegia, the Falklands, Kerguelen's Land, Etc. (1845–1847), the Flora Novae-Zelandiae (1851–1853), and the Flora Tasmaniae (1853–1859). They were "splendidly" illustrated by Walter Hood Fitch.

The larger part of the plant specimens collected during the Ross expedition are now part of the Kew Herbarium.

Context 

The British government fitted out an expedition led by James Clark Ross to investigate magnetism and marine geography in high southern latitudes, which sailed with two ships, HMS Terror and HMS Erebus on 29 September 1839 from Chatham.

The ships arrived, after several stops, at the Cape of Good Hope on 4 April 1840. On 21 April the giant kelp Macrocystis pyrifera was found off Marion Island, but no landfall could be made there or on the Crozet Islands due to the harsh winds. On 12 May the ships anchored at Christmas Harbour for two and a half months, during which all the plant species previously encountered by James Cook on the Kerguelen Islands were collected. On 16 August they reached the River Derwent, remaining in Tasmania until 12 November. A week later the flotilla stopped at Lord Auckland's Islands and Campbell's Island for the spring months.

Large floating forests of Macrocystis and Durvillaea were found until the ships ran into icebergs at latitude 61° S. Pack-ice was met at 68° S and longitude 175°. During this part of the voyage Victoria Land, Mount Erebus and Mount Terror were discovered. After returning to Tasmania for three months, the flotilla went via Sydney to the Bay of Islands, and stayed for three months in New Zealand to collect plants there. After visiting other islands, the ships returned to the Cape of Good Hope on 4 April 1843. At the end of the journey specimens of some fifteen hundred plant species had been collected and preserved.

Species 

According to Hooker, the flora of the islands south of Tasmania and New Zealand is related to that of New Zealand and bears no likeness to that of Australia. On the Auckland Islands wood grows near the sea and consists of the tree Metrosideros umbellata intermixed with woody Dracophyllum, Coprosma, hebes and Panax. These are undergrown by many ferns. Higher up grow alpines. On the Campbell Islands brushwood is limited to narrow bays which are relatively sheltered. These islands are steeper and rocky and have bear less vegetation, primarily grasses.

Plants collected by Hooker from Auckland and Campbell Islands are listed below. Species described by him should be cited with his acronym Hook.f. (Hooker filius), but this has not been applied here for brevity. Species already described by other authors are indicated though. Where applicable and as far as possible, the corrected botanical names, and the currently accepted name have been indicated accompanied by the abbreviated author names.

Seedplants 

The following seedplants are described by Hooker in Flora Antarctica.

 Acaena adscendens Vahl. 
 Acaena sanguisorbae Vahl. var. minor 
 Agrostris aucklandica 
 Agrostris leptostachys 
 Agrostris multicaulis 
 Agrostris subulata 
 Androstoma empetrifolia 
 Anisotome antipoda 
 Anisotome latifolia 
 Astelia linearis 
 Bromus antarcticus = Chionochloa antarctica (Hook.f.) Zotov 
 Chrysobactron rossii = Bulbinella rossii (Hook.f.) Cheeseman 
 Bulliardia moschata D’Urv. 
 Callitriche verna DC. var. terrestris 
 Cardamine corymbosa 
 Cardamine depressa 
 Cardamine hirsuta L. var. subcarnosa 
 Cardamine stellata 
 Carex appressa R.Br. 
 Carex ternate G.Forst.
 Carex trifida Cav. 
 Catabrosa antarctica 
 Celmisia vernicosa = Damnamenia vernicosa (Hook.f.) Given 
 Ceratella rosulata 
 Chiloglottis cornuta 
 Colobanthus billardieri = C. quitensis (Kunth) Bartl. 
 Colobanthus muscoides 
 Colobanthus subulatus (d’Urv.) Hook.f. 
 Coprosma affinis 
 Coprosma ciliata 
 Coprosma cuneata 
 Coprosma foetidissima G.Forst. 
 Coprosma myrtillifolia 
 Coprosma repens 
 Dracophyllum longifolium R.Br. 
 Dracophyllum scoparium 
 Epilobium confertifolium 
 Epilobium linnaeoides 
 Epilobium nerterioides A. Cunn. 
 Festuca foliosa 
 Festuca scoparia 
 Forstera clavigera 
 Gaimardia ciliata 
 Gaimardia pallida 
 Gentiana cerina 
 Gentiana concinna 
 Geranium microphyllum 
 Helichrysum prostratum 
 Hierochloe brunonis 
 Hierochloe redolens R.Br. 
 Isolepis aucklandica 
 Juncus antarcticus 
 Juncus scheuchzerioides Gaudich. var. inconspicuous 
 Leptinella lanata 
 Leptinella plumosa 
 Leptinella propinqua 
 Luzula crinita 
 Metrosideros lucida = M. umbellata Cav. 
 Montia fontana L. 
 Myosotis antarctica 
 Myosotis capitata 
 Nertera depressa Banks 
 Oreobolus pectinatus 
 Ozothamnus vauvilliersii Hombr. & Jacq. 
 Panax simplex G.Forst. 
 Plantago aucklandica 
 Plantago carnosa 
 Pleurophyllum criniferum 
 Pleurophyllum speciosum 
 Poa annua L. (introduced) 
 Poa breviglumis 
 Poa ramosissima 
 Pozoa reniformis 
 Pratia arenaria 
 Ranunculus acaulis Banks & Sol. 
 Ranunculus pinguis 
 Ranunculus subscaposus 
 Rostkovia gracilis 
 Rostkovia magellanica (Lam.) Hook.f. 
 Rumex cuneifolius Campd. var. alismaefolius 
 Sieversia albiflora 
 Stellaria decipiens 
 Stellaria media (L.) Vill. (introduced) 
 Aralia polaris = Stylbocarpa polaris (Hombr. & Jacq. ex Hook.f.) A.Gray 
 Suttonnia divaricata 
 Suttonnia tenuifolia 
 Thelymitra stenoperala 
 Trineuron spathulatum 
 Trisetum subspicatum Beauv. 
 Uncinia hookeri Boott 
 Urtica australis 
 Urtica aucklandica 
 Veronica benthami
 Veronica elliptica
 Veronica odora Hook.f.

Ferns and clubmosses
 
The following ferns and clubmosses are described by Hooker in Flora Antarctica from the Auckland and Campbell Islands.

 Three Asplenium species: 
 A. flaccidum G.Forst.
 A. obtusatum G.Forst.
 A. scleroprium Hombr. & Jacq.
 Lomaria lanceolata = Blechnum lanceolatum (R.Br.) Sturm
 L. procera = B. procerum
 Polypodium grammitidis = Ctenopteris heterophylla (Labill.) Tindale
 Grammitis australis = G. billardierei Willd.
 Pteris vespertilionis = Histiopteris incisa (Thunb.) J.Sm.
 five Hymenophyllum species:
 H. demissum
 H. flabellatum Lab.
 H. minimum A.Rich.
 H. multifidum
 H. rarum R.Br.
 Three species of Lycopodium:
 L. clavatum L. 
 L. scariosum Forst.
 L. varium = Huperzia varia (R.Br.) Trevis.
 Polypodium viscidum Spreng. = Hypolepis rufobarbata (Colenso) N.A.Wakef.
 Phymatodes billardierei = Polypodium phymatodes L.
 Aspidium venustum = Polystichum vestitum (G.Forst.) C.Presl
 Schizaea australis = Schizaea fistulosa Labill.

Mosses 

The following mosses are described by Hooker in Flora Antarctica from the Auckland and Campbell Islands.

 Four species of the genus Andreaea:
 A. acutifolia Hook.f. & Wils.
 A. mutabilis Hook.f. & Wils.
 A. nitida Hook.f. & Wils.
 A. subulata Harvey
 Anoectangium humboldti = Rhacocarpus purpurascens (Brid.) Paris
 Three Bartramia species: 
 B. patens
 B. pendula = Breutelia pendula
 B. robusta = B. patens var. robusta (Hook. f. & Wilson) Matteri
 Bryum annulatum = Gemmabryum dichotomum (Hedw.) J.R. Spence & H.P. Ramsay
 B. blandum Hook.f. & Wils.
 B. nutans = Pohlia nutans (Hedw.) Lindb.
 B. truncorum = B. billardieri (Brid.) Brid.
 B. wahlenbergii = Pohlia wahlenbergii (F.Weber & D.Mohr) A.L.Andrews
 Two species of Campylopus: 
 C. flexuosus (Rusty Swan-neck Moss)
 C. introflexus
 Ceratodon purpureus (Hedw.) Brid.
 Conostomum australe = C. pentastichum (Brid.) Lindb.
 Four species of Dicranum, now assigned to Dicranoloma: 
 D. billardieri Schwaeg. = Dicranoloma billarderii  (Brid.) Paris
 D. menziesii = Dicranoloma menziesii (Tayl.) Renauld
 D. pungens = Dicranoloma robustum (Hook.f. & Wilson) Paris
 D. setosum = Dicranoloma robustum (Hook.f. & Wilson) Paris
 Dryptodon crispulus = Racomitrium crispulum (Hook.f. & Wilson) Hook.f. & Wilson
 Funaria hygrometrica Hedw.
 Four species of Hookeria
 H. denticulata Mitt.
 H. nervosa Hook.f. & Wils.
 H. pennata = Cyathophorum bulbosum (Hedw.) Müll.Hal.
 H. pulchella = Distichophyllum pulchellum (Hampe) Mitt.
 Hypnum aciculare = Ptychomnion aciculare (Brid.) Mitt.
 H. acutifolium Hook.f. & Wils.
 H. arbuscula Sw.
 H. bifarium = Hymenodontopsis bifaria (Hook.) N.E.Bell, A.E.Newton & D.Quandt
 H. chlamydophyllum = Acrocladium chlamydophyllum (Hook.f. & Wils.) Müll.Hal. & Broth.
 H. cochlearifolium = Weymouthia cochlearifolia (Schwägr.) Dixon
 H. comosum = Mniodendron comosum var. comosum (Labill.) Lindb. ex Paris
 H. consimile Hook.f. & Wils.
 H. cupressiforme L.
 H. elongatum = Breutelia elongata (Hook.f. & Wilson) Mitt.
 H. filicinum L.
 H. fluitans L. = Warnstorfia fluitans (Hedw.) Loeske
 H. gracile Hook.f. & Wils.
 H. hispidum = Echinodium hispidum (Hook.f. & Wils.) Reichardt
 H. leptorhynchum = Rhaphidorrhynchium amoenum var. amoenum (Hedw.) M.Fleisch.
 H. rutabulum L. = Brachythecium rutabulum (Hedw.) Schimp.
 H. scabrifolium = Philonotis scabrifolia (Hook.f. & Wilson) Braithw.
 H. serpens L. = Amblystegium serpens (Hedw.) Bruch & Schimp.
 H. spiniforme L. = Pyrrhobryum spiniforme (Hedw.) Mitt.
 H. terraenovae var. australe = Isopterygium limatum (Hook.f. & Wilson) Broth.
 Leptostomum gracile = Leptostomum inclinans R.Br.
 Three species misprinted as Leskia (= Leskea):
 Leskia concinna = Lopidium concinnum (Hook.) Wilson
 L. novaehollandiae Schwaeg.
 L. tamariscina = Hypnum setigerum P. Beauv.
 Lophiodon strictus = Ditrichum strictum (Hook.f. & Wils.) Hampe
 M. acutifolium Brid.
 Macromitrium longirostre Schwaeg.  = M. acutifolium
 Racomitrium lanuginosum Brid.
  Two species of Orthotrichum:
 O. angustifolium Hook.f. & Wils.
 O. crassifolium Hook.f. & Wils.
 Polytrichum magellanicum = Polytrichadelphus magellanicus (Hedw.) Mitt.
 Schlotheimia quadrifida Brid. = S. angulosa (P. Beauv.) Dixon.
 Sphagnum compactum Brid.
 Two species of Splachnum now assigned to Tayloria:
 S. purpurascens = T. purpurascens (Hook.f. & Wils.) Broth.
 S. octoblepharum = T. octoblepharum (Hook.) Mitt.
 Sprucea perichaetialis =  Holomitrium perichaetiale (Hook.) Brid.
 Two species of Weissia:
 W. crispula = Dicranoweisia crispula (Hedwig) Milde
 W. contecta = Dicranoweisia contecta (Hook.f. & Wilson) Paris.

Liverworts

The Flora Antarctica contains a very large number of liverwort species from the Auckland and Campbell Islands, at that time almost all assigned to the genus Jungermannia. Of the 82 species mentioned in the Flora Antarctica, 79 have since been reassigned to other genera in the Jungermanniales. Hooker credits the scientists in the Cryptogamic Botany Department, especially Thomas Taylor, for their expertise and cooperation in preparing the sections on mosses, liverworts and lichens. The species published under their common authorship are generally indicated by Hook.f & Taylor. This has been omitted in this section for brevity. Authors are also not indicated with type species that have later been transferred to another genus while retaining the original species epithet, because this authority appears in the new combination between brackets. All other author (combinations) were indicated though.

 Anthoceros punctatus L.
 Hygropila dilatata Hook.f. & Taylor
 Jungermannia acinacifolia = Syzygiella acinacifolia (Hook.f. & Taylor) K.Feldberg, Váňa, Hentschel & Heinrichs
 J. albovirens = Cheilolejeunea albovirens (Hook. f. & Taylor) E.A. Hodgs.
 J. albula = Lepidozia ulothrix (Schwagr.) Lindenb.
 J. allodonta = Heteroscyphus allodontus (Hook.f. &. Taylor) J. J. Engel &. R. M. Schust.
 J. allophylla = Lepidolaena reticulata (Hook.f. & Taylor) Trevis.
 J. argentea = Zoopsis argentea (Hook. f. & Taylor) Spruce
 J. aterrima = Frullania aterrima (Hook.f. &. Taylor) Hook.f. & Taylor ex Gottsche, Lindenb. & Nees
 J. atrovirens, J. australis = Leptoscyphus australis (Gottsche. Lindenb. & Nees) Schust.
 J. balfouriana Taylor = Gottschea ciliistipula Colenso
 J. billardieri = Heteroscyphus billardieri (Schwägr.) Schiffn.
 J. bispinosa = Chiloscyphus bispinosus (Hook.f. & Taylor) J.J.Engel & R.M.Schust.
 J. circinalis = Plagiochila circinalis (Lehm. &. Lindenb.) Lehm. &. Lindenb. ex Lindenb.
 J. clavigera = Lepidolaena clavigera (Hook.) Dumort. ex Trevis.
 J. coalita = Heteroscyphus coalitus (Hook.) Schiffn.
 J. cognata Hook.f. & Taylor = Dinckleria pleurata (Hook.f. & Taylor) Trevis.
 J. colorata Lehm. = Jamesoniella colorata
 J. complanata = Radula complanata (L.) Dumort.
 J. congesta = Lethocolea congesta (Lehm.) S.W. Arnell
 J. cymbalifera = Heteroscyphus cymbalifer (Hook.f. & Taylor) J.J.Engel & R.M.Schust.
 J. diplophylla = Balantiopsis diplophylla (Hook.f. & Taylor) Mitt.
 J. dispar = Telaranea dispar (Mont. ex Hook.f. & Taylor) E.A.Hodgs.
 J. elegantula = Porella elegantula (Mont.) E.A.Hodgs.
 J. fasciculata (Lindenb.) Hook.f. & Taylor
 J. fissistipa = Heteroscyphus fissistipus (Hook.f. & Taylor) Schiffn.
 J. flabellata = Hymenophyton flabellatum (Labill.) Dumort. ex Trevis.
 J. furcata = Metzgeria furcata (L.) Dumort.
 J. fuscella = Plagiochila fuscella (Hook.f. & Taylor) Gottsche et al.
 J. grisea = Chiloscyphus novaezeelandiae var. novae-zeelandiae (Lehm. & Lindenb.) J.J.Engel & R.M.Schust.
 J. hemicardia = Plagiochila circinalis (Lehm. &. Lindenb.) Lehm. &. Lindenb. ex Lindenb.
 J. hippurioides = Kurzia hippurioides (Hook.f. & Taylor) Grolle
 J. hirsuta Nees = Lepicolea ochroleuca (L.f. ex Spreng.) Spruce
 J. implexicaulis = Cheilolejeunea implexicaulis (Taylor) R.M.Schuster
 J. involuta = Bazzania involuta (Mont.) Trevis.
 J. lehmannia Lind.
 J. intortifolia = Isotachis intortifolia (Hook.f. & Taylor) Gottsche
 J. laevifolia = Lepidozia laevifolia (Hook.f. & Taylor) Gottsche, Lindenb. & Nees
 J. latitans = Harpalejeunea latitans (Hook.f. & Taylor) Grolle
 J. lenta = Chiloscyphus lentus (Hook.f. & Taylor) J.J.Engel & R.M.Schust.
 J. leucophylla = Cryptolophocolea leucophylla (Hook.f. & Taylor) L.Söderstr.
 J. magellanica = Lepidolaena magellanica (Lam.) A.Evans
 J. mimosa = Cheilolejeunea mimosa (Hook.f. & Taylor) R.M.Schust.
 J. minuta Crantz = Eremonotus minutus (Schreb.) R.M.Schust.
 J. mollisima = Trichocolea mollissima (Hook.f. & Taylor) Gottsche
 J. multicuspidata = Protolophozia multicuspidata (Hook.f. & Taylor) Váňa & L.Söderstr.
 J. multifida Hook. = Riccardia multifida ssp. multifida (L.) Gray
 J. multipenna = Chiloscyphus multipennus (Hook.f. & Taylor) J.J.Engel & R.M.Schust.
 J. notophylla = Clasmatocolea notophylla (Hook.f. & Taylor) Grolle
 J. novaehollandiae Nees = Bazzania adnexa (Lehm. &. Lindenb.) Trevis.
 J. nutans = Lembidium nutans (Hook.f. & Taylor) Mitt. ex A.Evans
 J. occlusa = Calyptrocolea occlusa (Hook.f. & Taylor) R.M. Schust.
 J. ochrophylla = Acrobolbus ochrophyllus (Hook.f. & Taylor) R.M.Schust.
 J. pachyphylla = Pachyschistochila pachyphylla (Lehm.) R.M.Schust. & J.J.Engel
 J. patentissima = Telaranea patentissima (Hook.f. & Taylor) E.A.Hodgs.
 J. perigonialis = Andrewsianthus perigonialis (Hook.f. & Taylor) R.M.Schust.
 J. perpusilla = Chiloscyphus perpusillus (Hook.f. & Taylor) J.J.Engel
 J. phyllanthus = Podomitrium phyllanthus (Hook.) Mitt.
 J. physoloba (Mont.) Hook.f. = Radula physoloba Mont.
 J. pinnatifida Hook. = Riccardia chamedryfolia (With.) Grolle
 J. planiuscula = Heteroscyphus planiusculus (Hook.f. & Taylor) J.J.Engel
 J. pleurota = Dinckleria pleurata (Hook.f. & Taylor) Trevis.
 J. plicatiloba = Diplasiolejeunea plicatiloba (Hook.f. & Taylor) Grolle
 J. polyacantha = Eotrichocolea polyacantha (Hook.f. & Taylor) R.M.Schust.
 J. primordialis = Lejeunea primordialis (Hook.f. & Taylor) Taylor ex Gottsche, Lindenb. & Nees
 J. ptychantha = Frullania ptychantha (Mont.) Hook.f. & Taylor
 J. reticulata = Lepidolaena reticulata (Hook.f. & Taylor) Trevis.
 J. rostrata = Frullania rostrata (Hook.f. & Taylor) Hook.f. & Taylor ex Gottsche, Lindenb. & Nees
 J. saccata = Tylimanthus saccatus (Hook.) Mitt.
 J. scandens = Frullania scandens (Mont.) Hook.f. & Taylor
 J. schismoides = Anastrophyllum schismoides (Mont.) Steph.
 J. scolopendra = Leperoma scolopendra (Hook.) Bastow
 J. sinuosa = Heteroscyphus sinuosus (Hook.) Schiffn.
 J. spinifera = Chiloscyphus spiniferus (Hook.f. & Taylor) J.J.Engel & R.M.Schust.
 J. strongylophylla = Clasmatocolea strongylophylla (Hook.f. & Taylor) Grolle
 J. stygia = Herzogobryum teres (Carrington & Pearson) Grolle
 J. tenacifolia = Chiloscyphus tenacifolius (Hook.f. & Taylor) Hentschel & J.Heinrichs
 J. tenax = Kurzia tenax (Grev.) Grolle
 J. tetradactyla = Telaranea tetradactyla (Hook.f. &. Taylor) E.A.Hodgs.
 J. turgescens = Clasmatocolea strongylophylla (Hook.f. & Taylor) Grolle
 J. urvilleana Gottsche, Lind. & Lehm. = Acrobolbus concinnus (Mitt.) Grolle
 J. uvifera = Patarola uvifera (Hook.f. & Taylor) Trevis
 J. vertebralis = Blepharidophyllum vertebrale (Taylor ex Gottsche, Lindenb. &. Nees) Angstr.
 Marchantia polymorpha L. (common liverwort).

Green algae

 Codium tomentosum Stack (velvet horn)
 Ulva latissima L. = Saccharina latissima (L.) C.E.Lane, C.Mayes, Druehl & G.W.Saunders (sea belt).

Red algae

 Ballia brunonia = B. callitricha (Agardh) Kütz.
 Callithamnion gracile Hook.f. & Harvey
 C. hirtum =  Lophothamnion hirtum (Hook.f. & Harvey) Womersley
 C. micropterum Hook.f. & Harvey = C. cryptopterum Kütz.
 C. pectinatum = Antithamnion pectinatum (Mont.) Brauner
 Ceramium cancellatum = C. planum Kütz.
 C. diaphanum var. aucklandicum Hook.f. & Harvey
 C. rubrum var. secundatum (Lyngb.) Agardh
 C. rubrum var. tenue Agardh
 Chondrus tuberculosus = Iridaea tuberculosa (Hook.f. & Harvey) Leister
 Conferva pacifica = Spongomorpha pacifica (Mont.) Kütz.
 C. verticillata Hook.f. & Harvey = ? illegitimate later homonym of C. verticillata Lightfoot, 1777
 Delesseria crassinerva = Nitophyllum bonnemaisonii var. crassinerva Batters
 Dumontia cornuta Hook.f. & Harvey
 D. filiformis =  D. contorta (S.G.Gmelin) Ruprecht
 Gigartina divaricata Hook.f. & Harvey
 Grateloupia aucklandica = Glaphyrosiphon aucklandicus (Mont.) W.A.Nelson, S.Y.Kim & S.M.Boo
 Griffithsia setacea (Huds.) Agardh = Halurus flosculosus (J.Ellis) Maggs & Hommersand
 Halymenia latissima = Iridaea latissima (Hook.f. & Harvey) Grunow
 Iridaea radula = Sarcothalia radula (Esper) Edyvane & Womersley
 Hypnea multicornis (Mont.) Mont.
 Jania hombronii = Corallina hombronii (Mont.) Mont. ex Kütz.
 Laurentia pinnatifida var. angustifolia (Turner) Grev. = Osmundea hybrida (DC) K.W.Nam
 Nitophyllum crispatum = Haraldiophyllum crispatum (Hook.f. & Harvey) S.-M.Lin, Hommersand & W.A.Nelson
 Nitophyllum punctatum (Stackh.) Grev.
 Nothogenia variolosa (Mont.) Mont.
 Phyllophora obtusa = Rhodymenia obtusa (Grev.) Womersley
 Plocamium coccineum = Plocamium cartilagineum (L.) P.S.Dixon
 Polysiphonia botryocarpa = Microcolax botryocarpus (Hook.f. & Harvey) F.Schmitz
 P. ceratoclada = Herposiphonia ceratoclada (Mont.) Reinbold
 P. cladostephus = Brongniartella australis (Agardh) F.Schmitz
 Polysiphonia decipiens Mont.
 P. dumosa Hook.f. & Harvey
 P. lyalli = Echinothamnion lyallii (Hook.f. & Harvey) Kylin ex P.C.Silva
 P. punicea = Heterosiphonia punicea (Mont.) Kylin
 P. rudis Hook.f. & Harvey
 Polyzonia cuneifolia = Euzonia cuneifolia (Mont.) Kylin
 Porphyra capensis Kütz
 Ptilota formosissima = Euptilota formosissima (Mont.) Kütz.
 Rhodymenia dichotoma Hook.f. & Harvey
 R. hombroniana = Callophyllis hombroniana (Mont.) Kütz.
 R. ornata = Callophyllis ornata (Mont.) Kütz.
 Rhodomela glomerata Mont.

Brown algae

 Adenocystis lessoni (Bory) Hook.f. & Harvey = A. utricularis (Bory) Skottsberg
 Asperococcus echinatus = A. fistulosus (Hudson) Hook.
 Chorda lomentaria = Scytosiphon lomentaria (Lyngb.) Link
 Cordaria flagelliformis (O.F.Müller) Agardh (slimy whip weed)
 Desmarestia viridis Lamour. (stringy acid kelp)
 Dictyosiphon fasciculatus = Scytothamnus fasciculatus (Hook.f. & Harvey) A.D.Cotton
 Durvillaea utilis Bory =  Durvillaea antarctica (Chamisso) Hariot
 Laminaria sp. (kelp)
 Macrocystis pyrifera (L.) Agardh (giant bladder kelp)
 Marginaria urvilleana = Marginariella urvilleana (A.Rich.) Tandy
 Sphacelaria funicularis = Halopteris funicularis (Mont.) Sauvageau
 Xyphophora billardieri = X. gladiata (Lab.) Mont. ex Kjellman.

Diatoms
 Schizonema crispum Mont..

Lichens

 Caenomyce aggregata = ?
 C. pyxidata = Cladonia pyxidata (L.) Hoffm.
 C. rangiferina = Cladonia rangiferina (L.) Weber ex F.H. Wigg.
 C. uncialis = Cladonia uncialis (L.) Weber ex F.H. Wigg.
 Lecanora hypnorum = Psoroma hypnorum (Vahl) Gray
 L. parella = Ochrolechia parella (L.) A.Massal.
 L. tartarea = Ochrolechia tartarea (L.) A.Massal.
 L. versicolor = Degeliella versicolor (Müll.Arg.) P.M.Jørg
 Lecidea geomaea = Micarea lignaria var. lignaria (Ach.) Hedl.
 Opegrapha atra Pers.
 Parmelia rubiginosa = Pannaria rubiginosa (Ach.) Bory (rusty bordermoss)
 P. sphinctrina = Pannaria sphinctrina (Mont.) Hue
 Peltidea polydactyla = Peltigera polydactylon (Neck.) Hoffm., Descr. et Adumb.
 Porina granulata = Coccotrema granulatum (Hook.f. & Taylor)  R.Sant.
 Ramalina inflata = R. inflata subsp. inflata (Hook.f. & Taylor) Hook.f. & Taylor
 Sphaerophoron australe = Budonophoron australe (Laurer) A.Massal
 S. compressum Ach.
 S. tenerum = Leifidium tenerum (Laurer) Wedin
 Sticta cellulifera Hook.f. & Taylor
 S. foveolata Delise
 S. freycinetii = Pseudocyphellaria glabra (Hook.f. & Taylor) C.W.Dodge
 S. menziesii  Hook.f. & Taylor
 Thelotrema lepadinum (Ach.) Ach.
 S. orygmaea Ach.
 S. richardi = S. faveolata var. richardi (Mont.) Linds.
 Usnea barbata var. sulphurea Hook.f. & Taylor
 U. plicata var. hirta = U. hirta (L.) Weber ex F.H. Wigg..

Fungi
The following fungi are described by Hooker in Flora Antarctica from the Auckland and Campbell Islands.

 Agaricus pyxidatus = Omphalina pyxidata (Bull.) Quél.
 Antennaria scoriadea   Berk. (on Dracophyllum longifolium) - new name not found but necessary because Antennaria is taken by an Asteraceae - 
 Asteroma dilatatum Berk. (on Panax simplex)
 Cladosporium herbarum (Pers.) Link (on Carex adpressa)
 Aylographum bromi  Berk. (on Bromus antarcticus)
 Hendersonia microsticta Berk. (on Bulbinella rossii)
 Dothidea hemisphaerica = Clypeostroma hemisphaericum (Berk.) Theiss. & Syd. (on Veronica odora)
 Dothidea spilomea  = Clypeostroma spilomeum (Berk.) Theiss. & Syd. (on Veronica elliptica)
 Hysterium brevi Berk. (on Uncinea hookeri)
 Sclerotium durum Pers. (on  capsules of Gentiana concinna)
 Sphaeria depressa Berk. = Physalospora depressa (Berk.) Sacc. (on Luzula crinita)
 S. herbarum = Pleospora herbarum (Pers.) Rabenh. (on Bulbinella rossii)
 S. nebulosa = Phoma nebulosa (Pers.) Berk.
 S. nigrella = Diaporthopsis nigrella (Auersw.) Fabre
 S. phaeosticta = Anthostomella phaeosticta (Berk.) Sacc.
 Uredo antarctica = Puccinia tenuispora McAlpine (on Luzula crinita).

References

External links
 All volumes at Biodiversity Heritage Library
 Illustrations from 7 volumes: 1, 1(1), 1(2), 2(1), 2(2), 3(1), 3(2)

Aukland
.
.
Books about Antarctica
1840s books
Books about New Zealand
Botany in New Zealand